Albimonas is a genus in the phylum Pseudomonadota (Bacteria).

Etymology
The name Albimonas derives from:Latin adjective albus, white; Greek feminine gender noun monas (μονάς), monad, unit; New Latin feminine gender noun Albimonas, white monad.

Members of the genus Albimonas can be referred to as albimonads (viz. Trivialisation of names).

Species
The genus contains a single species, namely A. donghaensis ( Lim et al. 2008,  (Type species of the genus).; New Latin feminine gender adjective donghaensis, belonging to Donghae, where the organism was isolated.)

See also
 Bacterial taxonomy
 Microbiology

References 

Bacteria genera
Rhodobacteraceae
Monotypic bacteria genera